Boulengerella cuiveri, commonly known as the bicuda, is a species of pike-characin in the family Ctenoluciidae.

The fish is named in honor of Georges Cuvier (1769-1832), French naturalist and zoologist, because he was first to accurately diagnose the family Salmones, which at that time included all characiform fishes.

Description
It has ten to eleven dorsal soft rays, nine to eleven anal soft rays, and 48 to 49 vertebrae. It lacks dorsal and anal spines. It is a carnivore, and typically preys upon smaller fish.

Distribution and habitat
Boulengerella cuiveri is a freshwater fish native to the Amazon region. It can be found in Peru and Brazil, the Orinoco River in Colombia and Venezuela, and the tributaries of the Amazon, such as the Tocantins River, Araguaia River, Negro River, Madeira River, and others as far as Bolivia. Furthermore, it is can also be found in the Essequibo River in Guiana, Suriname, and French Guiana. It can be found on the surface of areas with rapidly flowing water, usually behind obstacles such as fallen logs or rocks.

Status
This species has not been evaluated by the IUCN Red List.

References

 Ctenoluciidae
Taxa named by Johann Baptist von Spix
Taxa_named_by_Louis_Agassiz
 Fish described in 1829
 Fish of Brazil
 Fish of Peru
 Fish of Colombia
 Fish of Venezuela
 Fish of Bolivia
 Fish of Suriname
 Fish of French Guiana